Statistics of Ekstraklasa in the 1980–81 season.

Overview
It was contested by 16 teams, and Widzew Łódź won the championship.

League table

Results

Top goalscorers

References

External links
 Poland – List of final tables at RSSSF 

Ekstraklasa seasons
1980–81 in Polish football
Pol